Hovea acutifolia, is a species of flowering plant in the family Fabaceae. It is an upright, small shrub with blue to purple pea flowers, dark green leaves and rusty coloured new growth. It grows in Queensland and New South Wales.

Description

Taxonomy and naming
Hovea acutifolia was first formally described in 1832 by George Don and the description was published in A General History of Dichlamydeous. The specific epithet (acutifolia) means "acute-leaved".

Distribution and habitat
This species grows in damp, protected rainforest margins in New South Wales and Queensland.

References

acutifolia
Flora of Queensland
Flora of New South Wales
Fabales of Australia
Plants described in 1832